Bernardo Tomei (born 10 September 1933) is an Italian ice hockey player. He competed in the men's tournament at the 1956 Winter Olympics.

References

1933 births
Living people
Ice hockey players at the 1956 Winter Olympics
Olympic ice hockey players of Italy
Place of birth missing (living people)